Norman Daniels (born 1942) is an American philosopher, ethicist, bioethicist, and healthcare policy author at Harvard University.

Norman Daniels or Norm Daniels may also refer to:

 Norm Daniels (American football) (1907–2009), American athlete and coach
 Norman A. Daniels (1905–1995), American pulp fiction and television writer 
 Norm Daniels ( 20th–21st century), former CEO of the G.I. Joe's retail chain
Norman Daniels, antagonist of the novel Rose Madder